William Hugh Albright (October 20, 1944 – September 17, 1998) was an American composer, pianist and organist.

Biography 
Albright was born in Gary, Indiana, and began learning the piano at the age of five, and attended the Juilliard Preparatory Department (1959–62), the Eastman School of Music (1962–63) and the University of Michigan (1962–70), where he studied composition with Ross Lee Finney and George Rochberg, and organ with Marilyn Mason. He interrupted his studies for the 1968–69 academic year when he received a Fulbright scholarship to study with Olivier Messiaen in Paris. Upon his graduation in 1970 he was appointed to the faculty of the University of Michigan, where he taught composition and directed the electronic music studio until his death from liver failure in Ann Arbor, Michigan, in 1998.

Career 
His music combined elements of tonal and non-tonal classical music (in particular the influence of Messiaen) with American popular music and non-Western music, in what has been described as "polystylistic" or "quaquaversal" music—which makes the definition of an overall style difficult. Albright's approach to some of his music has been considered to be surrealistic. He was an enthusiast for ragtime and made notable recordings of the piano rags of Scott Joplin and others. He also recorded an album of his own ragtime compositions.

In addition to his compositional and teaching activities, Albright maintained an active career and was regarded as both a virtuoso organist and pianist, performing many recitals on both instruments throughout North American and Europe. He was the featured organist for the 1976 International Contemporary Organ Music Festival at the Hartt School of Music. He had earlier been commissioned to write his organ work Stipendium Peccati for the 1973 International Contemporary Organ Music Festival. He commissioned new works for the organ from other contemporary composers to play on his international concert tours. His hymns appear in hymnals of the Unitarian and Episcopal Churches.

Albright's notable students include Derek Bermel, John Burke, Evan Chambers, Chihchun Chi-sun Lee, Gabriela Lena Frank, Alexander Frey, Evan Hause, Katt Hernandez, Joseph Lukasik, John Howell Morrison, Carter Pann, Frank Ticheli, and Michael Sidney Timpson.

Honors 

 Two Fulbright fellowships
 Two Guggenheim Fellowships
 Niagara University's Symphonic Composition Award
 Two National Endowment for the Arts Grants
 Two Koussevitzky Commissions
 Composer-In-Residence at the American Academy in Rome, 1979
 Queen Marie-Jose Prize
 American Academy of Arts and Letters
 University of Michigan's Distinguished Service Award and Faculty Recognition Award.

Selected Compositions 

Three Novelty Rags
Alliance
Stipendium Peccati
Bacchanal
Organbook I and II, for organ and tape
Chasm, for organ. Commissioned by the Ann Arbor and Detroit chapters of the American Guild of Organists for the 1986 AGO National Convention in Ann Arbor, premiered by Marilyn Mason.

References

Sources

Further reading
 Beckford, Richard Edward. 1997. "The Organ Symphony: Its Evolution in France and Transformation in Selected Works by Composers of the Twentieth Century". DMA diss. Baton Rouge: Louisiana State University.
 Krahn, Stephen W. 1994. "Structural, Tonal, and Linear Problems in William Albright's Symphony for Organ". DMA diss. Lincoln: University of Nebraska.
 Little, Jeanie R. 1975. "Serial, Aleatoric, and Electronic Techniques in American Organ Music Published between 1960 and 1972." Ph.D. diss. Ames: University of Iowa.
 Santos, Eric. 1999. "Requiem for Bill Albright". Perspectives of New Music 37, no. 1 (Winter): 35–37.
 Szoka, Marta. 1994. "Twórczosc Williama Albrighta na tle wspólczesnej muzyki organowej w USA" [The Works of William Albright against the Background of Contemporary Organ Music]. In Organy i muzyka organowa IX (Prace specjalne 52), edited by Janusz Krassowski. Gdańsk: Akademia Muzyczna im. Stanisława Moniuszki.

External links
William Albright obituary
William Albright's page, Theodore Presser Company

1944 births
1998 deaths
20th-century American composers
20th-century American male musicians
20th-century classical composers
American classical composers
American contemporary classical composers
American male classical composers
Contemporary classical music performers
Eastman School of Music alumni
Juilliard School Pre-College Division alumni
Musicians from Gary, Indiana
Ragtime composers
University of Michigan faculty
University of Michigan School of Music, Theatre & Dance alumni
Fulbright alumni